Appointment with Drama is a British anthology series which aired in 1955 on the BBC. Only a single episode is known to survive as a kinescope recording: The Apollo Of Bellac telecast from 12 August 1955. Nevertheless, the program represents an early surviving example of British television drama.

References

External links
Appointment with Drama on IMDb

1950s British drama television series
1955 British television series debuts
1955 British television series endings
Lost BBC episodes
Black-and-white British television shows
BBC television dramas
1950s British anthology television series